Rizia (Greek: Ρίζια) is a village in the municipal unit of Vyssa in the northern part of the Evros regional unit in Greece. It is situated on the right bank of the river Ardas. The nearest large village is Kastanies to its northeast, on the Turkish border.

Population

History

Its name during the Ottoman rule was Dujaros (Дуджарос - Dudzharos in Bulgarian). After a brief period of Bulgarian rule between 1913 and 1919, it became part of Greece. As a result, its Bulgarian and Turkish population was exchanged with Greek refugees, mainly from today's Turkey.

See also
List of settlements in the Evros regional unit

External links
http://www.freewebs.com/rizia-evrou
http://www.vyssa.gr/cgs.cfm?areaid=1&id=5 
Rizia on GTP Travel Pages

References

Populated places in Evros (regional unit)
Vyssa